The 2020 ARIA Music Awards are the 34th Annual Australian Recording Industry Association Music Awards (generally known as ARIA Music Awards or simply The ARIAs) and consist of a series of awards, including the 2020 ARIA Artisan Awards, ARIA Hall of Fame Awards, ARIA Fine Arts Awards and the ARIA Awards. The ARIA Awards ceremony occurred on 25 November 2020, with Delta Goodrem as host. However, due to COVID-safe restrictions, it was without an audience and was broadcast from the Star Event Centre, Sydney on the Nine Network around Australia. In place of the usual Red Carpet event, a pre-show was broadcast from The Star's backstage and was hosted by Ash London and Mitch Churi. The pre-show had 16 awards presented ahead of the main ceremony.

The ARIA CEO Dan Rosen had explained to Lars Brandle of Billboard, "There will be an ARIA stage with real people on it, [it] just won't have a live audience in there." Nine Network's Brooke Boney announced the nominees on 13 October via ARIA's YouTube channel with Dean Lewis, Guy Sebastian, and Tones and I appearing. Tame Impala won the most awards with five from seven nominations, Lime Cordiale received the most nominations with eight and Sampa the Great received six nominations, while winning three. Archie Roach was inducted into the ARIA Hall of Fame. During the ceremony he was joined on a stage in Warrnambool by family, friends and collaborators to sing, "Took the Children Away". A tribute performance of "I Am Woman", in memory of 2006 ARIA Hall of Fame inductee, Helen Reddy (1941–2020), was given by an ensemble of female singers backed by a virtual chorus.

Sampa the Great won Best Hip Hop Release for the second year in a row. The category had been created after splitting Best Urban Release into two. Upon her win in the previous year, she was the first female person of colour to win a hip hop award at the ARIAs. However her acceptance speech "about diversity and inclusivity" was not broadcast as the network switched to a commercial. HuffPosts Alicia Vrajlal reported that various artists had criticised "systemic racism" in Australia and its music industry for years. At the 2020 ceremony Sampa the Great performed "Final Form", introduced by her rapping an acceptance speech which included reference to the hurt inflicted by the previous year's ARIA broadcast. Prior to this year's ceremony, Rosen had acknowledged his organisation had handled diverse artists poorly and admitted that "we need to do better."

Performers 

A tribute performance of "I Am Woman", in honour of Helen Reddy, was given by an ensemble of Australian female singers, they were introduced by former Australian Prime Minister, Julia Gillard. The ensemble comprised Amy Shark, Christine Anu, Delta Goodrem, Emma Watkins, Jessica Mauboy, Kate Ceberano, Marcia Hines, Montaigne, the McClymonts and Tones and I. They were backed by a virtual choir of Amy Sheppard, Christie Whelan Browne, Clare Bowen, Dami Im, Emma Donovan, Erika Heynatz, Fanny Lumsden, Graace, Kate Miller-Heidke, Katie Noonan, KLP, Maddy Jane, Missy Higgins, Mo'Ju, Odette, Samantha Jade, Teeny Tiny Stevies, Thandi Phoenix and Wendy Matthews.

Performers for the ARIA Awards ceremony:

Presenters 

Delta Goodrem hosted the 2020 ARIA Music Awards main ceremony with the presenters: Briggs, Brooke Boney, Christine Anu, Guy Sebastian, Hamish Blake, INXS, Joel Creasey, Julia Gillard, Kate Ceberano, Keith Urban, Kylie Minogue, Mick Fleetwood, Richard Wilkins, Robbie Williams, Sophie Monk, Tim Minchin, Tones and I, and Tuma Basa & A$AP Ferg. Pre-Show presenters were: Briggs, Anu, Ceberano, Matt Okine & KLP, Mia Rodriguez, Montaigne, Morgan Evans and Nat's What I Reckon.

ARIA Hall of Fame inductee

Upon the announcement of Archie Roach's induction into the ARIA Hall of Fame, the Indigenous Australian musician reflected on changes for local First Nations people during his career. He had released his debut album, Charcoal Lane, in May 1990 and its lead single, "Took the Children Away" (September 1990). He detailed his own experience of the Stolen Generations and addressed the issue of the Australian government's policy, where Indigenous children were forcibly removed from their parents. Roach observed, "When you have written a song and perform a song you just hope people listen to it. I am glad that I was among the first people that opened up about that and began that conversation." He also acknowledged the wider acceptance of Indigenous artists, "I feel more Australian now, I feel more part of the broader community rather than a sub-group or a subculture."

For the virtual ceremony Roach was at the Lighthouse Theatre, Warrnambool (his hometown), where he was joined for his song, "Took the Children Away", by family, friends and collaborators including Paul Grabowsky (piano), Paul Kelly (vocal), Linda Bull (vocal), Jessica Hitchcock (vocal), Steve Magnusson (guitar), Sam Anning (bass guitar), Dave Beck (drums), Erkki Veltheim (violin), and Nola Roach (vocal). Besides his induction Roach won two more awards, Best Male Artist and Best Adult Contemporary Album for Tell Me Why (November 2019).

 Archie Roach

Nominees and winners

ARIA Awards

Winners indicated in boldface, with other nominees in plain.

Public voted

Fine Arts Awards

Winners indicated in boldface, with other nominees in plain.

Artisan Awards

Winners indicated in boldface, with other nominees in plain.

References

External links
 

2020 in Australian music
2020 music awards
ARIA Music Awards